Al Rahd is a district of Al Qadarif state, Sudan.

References

Districts of Sudan